"Real Love" is a song written by David Malloy, Richard "Spady" Brannon and Randy McCormick, and recorded as a duet by American entertainers Dolly Parton and Kenny Rogers that topped the U.S. country singles charts in August 1985.  It was released in April 1985 the second single and title track from Parton's Real Love album.  Released after the top-ten success of "Don't Call It Love", the song became Parton and Rogers' second country chart-topper as a duet act.  However, "Real Love" did not fare as well on the pop singles charts as 1983's "Islands in the Stream" had done, stalling at number 91 on the Billboard Hot 100 and number 13 on the Adult Contemporary chart.

Unlike "Islands in the Stream," "Real Love" was not composed by the Bee Gees who had composed and produced Rogers' 1983 chart topping album Eyes That See in the Dark which also included another four of Rogers' hit singles from 1983 and 1984, namely "Buried Treasure", "This Woman", "Midsummer Nights" and "Evening Star".

Parton and Rogers embarked on a nine-city U.S. concert tour in February 1985, from which an HBO concert special, "Real Love" was filmed; a music video for the "Real Love" single was produced using footage from the HBO special.

Parton also recorded a solo version in November 1984, which was later included on the 1995 album I Will Always Love You: The Essential Dolly Parton One.

Chart positions

References

External links

Real Love lyrics at Dolly Parton On-Line

1985 singles
Dolly Parton songs
Kenny Rogers songs
Male–female vocal duets
Songs written by David Malloy
Song recordings produced by David Malloy
RCA Records Nashville singles
Songs written by Randy McCormick
1985 songs